Lucas Friedrich Julius Dominikus von Heyden (22 May 1838, Frankfurt – 13 September 1915, Frankfurt) was a German entomologist specialising in beetles (Coleoptera).  He wrote with Edmund Reitter and Julius Weise Catalogus coleopterorum Europae, Caucasi et Armeniae rossicae. Edn 2. Berlin, Paskau, Caen (1902). He also worked with his father Carl von Heyden on fossil insects.

External links
Portrait, obituary list

German entomologists
Coleopterists
1838 births
1915 deaths